Andre Gordon is an American film and television actor as well as a producer, writer and director.

Early life and education 

Andre was born in Saint Andrew, Jamaica and grew up in Miami, Florida. He is an alumnus of the BFA program at Florida State University.

Career 
Since 2005, Gordon had appeared in at least 30 films and at least 19 television productions. He has also served as a producer or assistant producer for at least 29 films Andre has worked theatrically in both film and television, which includes guest appearances on: Modern Family, Haunted Hathaways, Raising Hope, MAD TV, Campus Ladies, Scrubs, Phineas and Ferb and Zoey 101 along with the features, Like Mike, and SWAT. He is also a producer and lead actor in Sony's film franchise Cross starring Michael Clarke Duncan, Brian Austin Greene, Vinnie Jones, Danny Trejo, and Michael Madsen.

Andre has directed Morgan Freeman, Ed Begley Jr., and Kathryn Joosten in "Wish Wizard," James Caan in "Acre Beyond the Rye", Armand Assante in "You Can't Have It," C Thomas Howell in "Wedding Day," and more.

In 2015 Andre Gordon and the cast of The Jungle Bunch won the International Emmy Award for best Kids Animation Show.

In 2018 Gordon and the cast of Miraculous Lady Bug won the Teen Choice Award for Choice Animated TV Series.

Currently, Gordon is directing and producing a documentary "When I Grow Up" set for release in December 2020.

Andre is also President and C.E.O of 4Horsemen Films.

Filmography

References

External links 
 
 

American male television actors
Year of birth missing (living people)
Living people
people from Saint Andrew Parish, Jamaica
American male film actors
21st-century American male actors